Christina Louise Twomey,  is an Australian historian and academic.

Education and career

Twomey was born in Queensland and attended Mac.Robertson Girls' High School in Melbourne. She graduated from the University of Melbourne with a Bachelor of Arts with Honours. She returned to the university in 1992 to complete her Doctor of Philosophy, graduating in 1996. She is the head of Philosophical, Historical and International Studies at Monash University in Melbourne. Her area of study focuses on the cultural history of war.

In 2004 Twomey won the Margaret George Award, a grant presented by National Archives of Australia to emerging  historians, for her "exploration of the experiences of Australian civilians interned by the Japanese in World War II". Twomey's 2008 book, Australia's Forgotten Prisoners: Civilians Interned by the Japanese in World War Two won a New South Wales Premier's History Award in the John and Patricia Ward History Prize category. In 2009, the National Archives of Australia awarded Twomey the Frederick Watson Fellowship.

Twomey was president of the International Australian Studies Association in 2011 to 2012. Between 2012 and 2015, she was the co-editor of Australian Historical Studies alongside Catharine Coleborne, after which she was appointed chair of the Board managing that publication. In 2016 her work as an historian was recognised by her election as fellow of both the Academy of the Social Sciences in Australia and Australian Academy of the Humanities. In May 2016, she attended a Historians without Borders conference in Helsinki. 

In 2018, Twomey won the New South Wales Premier's Australian History Prize for her book, The Battle Within: POWs in Postwar Australia.

Bibliography

Author

Editor

References

21st-century Australian historians
21st-century Australian women writers
Australian women historians
Fellows of the Academy of the Social Sciences in Australia
Fellows of the Australian Academy of the Humanities
Living people
Academic staff of Deakin University
Academic staff of Monash University
University of Melbourne alumni
Writers from Melbourne
Year of birth missing (living people)
People educated at Mac.Robertson Girls' High School